The grey pogonomelomys (Pogonomelomys brassi) is a species of rodent in the family Muridae. It is found in Indonesia and Papua New Guinea.

Taxonomy 

This species was formerly included as a subspecies of Pogonomelomys bruijnii  (Lowland brush mouse).

References

Mammals described in 1941
Mammals of Indonesia
Mammals of Papua New Guinea